Vitaly Popkov (born 16 June 1983) is a Ukrainian-born Russian racing cyclist, who last rode for Russian amateur team Crimea Region.

Major results

Track

2002
 1st  Team pursuit, UEC European Under-23 Championships
 2nd Team pursuit, UCI World Cup Classics, Moscow
2003
 1st  Team pursuit, UEC European Under-23 Championships
 1st Team pursuit, UCI World Cup Classics, Cape Town
2004
 1st  Team pursuit, UEC European Under-23 Championships
 1st Team pursuit, 2004–05 UCI Track Cycling World Cup Classics, Moscow
 2nd Team pursuit, 2004 UCI Track Cycling World Cup Classics, Moscow
2005
 2nd Team pursuit, UEC European Under-23 Championships
 3rd Team pursuit, 2005–06 UCI Track Cycling World Cup Classics, Moscow
2006
 2nd Team pursuit, 2005–06 UCI Track Cycling World Cup Classics, Sydney
2007
 2006–07 UCI Track Cycling World Cup Classics, Los Angeles
1st Individual pursuit
1st Team pursuit
 2nd Team pursuit, UCI World Championships
2008
 3rd Team pursuit, 2007–08 UCI Track Cycling World Cup Classics, Los Angeles
2009
 1st Individual pursuit, 2009–10 UCI Track Cycling World Cup Classics, Cali

Road

2003
 1st Stage 2 Tour de Hongrie
2008
 1st Stage 2 Tour de Ribas
 2nd Kirschblütenrennen
2009
 1st Overall Tour of Szeklerland
1st Stage 1
 2nd Memorial Oleg Dyachenko
 4th Grand Prix of Donetsk
 4th Mayor Cup
 4th GP E.O.S. Tallinn
2010
 National Road Championships
1st  Time trial
1st  Road race
 1st Overall Grand Prix of Adygeya
1st Prologue & Stage 3
 1st Grand Prix of Donetsk
 1st Rogaland GP
 1st Grand Prix Jasnej Góry-Czestochowa
 1st Grand Prix of Sochi
 1st Stage 1 Tour of Szeklerland
 3rd Overall Five Rings of Moscow
1st Stage 3
 4th Mayor Cup
 8th Route Adélie
 9th Overall Course de la Solidarité Olympique
2011
 5th Overall Tour of Szeklerland
2012
 1st Overall Tour of Szeklerland
 1st Grand Prix of Moscow
 1st Race Horizon Park
 1st Stage 6 Course de la Solidarité Olympique
 1st Stage 4 (ITT) Dookoła Mazowsza
2013
 1st  Overall Course de la Solidarité Olympique
1st  Points classification
1st Stage 1
 1st Stage 3 Azerbaijan International Cycling Tour
 2nd Overall GP of Adygeya
1st Stage 2
 2nd Overall Tour of Szeklerland
1st Stage 3 (ITT)
 3rd Overall Grand Prix of Sochi
1st Stage 1
 3rd Košice–Miskolc
 7th Grand Prix of Donetsk
2014
 9th Memorial Oleg Dyachenko

External links
 

1983 births
Living people
Ukrainian male cyclists
Ukrainian track cyclists
Cyclists at the 2004 Summer Olympics
Cyclists at the 2008 Summer Olympics
Olympic cyclists of Ukraine
Sportspeople from Chernivtsi Oblast
21st-century Ukrainian people